is a railway station on the Aterazawa Line in the city of Sagae, Yamagata, Japan, operated by East Japan Railway Company (JR East).

Lines

Station layout
The station has a single side platform serving a single bi-directional track. The station building is designed in the image of nearby Jion-ji temple, which is a National Important Cultural Property.

History
Uzen-Takamatsu Station began operation on 23 April 1922. From 1926 to 1974, the station was also used by the now-defunct Sanzan Line of the Yamagata Railway, and during that period had two opposed side platforms, and a bay platform. With the privatization of JNR on 1 April 1987, the station came under the control of JR East. A new station building was completed in February 2002, replacing a previous structure dating from 1940.

Surrounding area
 Jion-ji Temple
Takamatsu Elementary School
Mogami River
Daigo Elementary School

See also
List of Railway Stations in Japan

References

External links 

 Uzen-Takamatsu Station (JR East) 

Railway stations in Yamagata Prefecture
Aterazawa Line
Railway stations in Japan opened in 1922
Sagae, Yamagata